An Australian rules football card (colloquially referred to as a Footy card) is a type of trading card relating to Australian rules football, usually printed on cardboard, silk, or plastic. These cards feature one or more Australian rules football players. Cards are almost exclusively found in Australia as no top-level leagues are present outside the country. Prices for Australian rules football cards can be very high. This is illustrated for both vintage and modern cards such as an 1894 American Tobacco Company card featuring Essendon player Will Crebbin which sold for $10,110 in 2018 and a 2004 Select AFL Conquest Triple Brownlow Medallist signature card featuring Nathan Buckley, Adam Goodes and Mark Ricciuto which was valued at $3,000 in 2018.

History of Australian rules football cards

Pre-1900 
The first Australian rules football cards were produced in conjunction with Goodwin & Co's Old Judge Cigarettes in the late 1880s. Early Australian rules football cards are distinguished from Carte de visite portrait photograph cards as the former were for mass commercial dissemination whilst the latter were often for personal use. The Goodwin & Co's Old Judge set included Australian rules footballers from Victoria and South Australia. The Old Judge cards are hard to find due to the photographs on the cards fading substantially over time.

Another set from this period was produced by the American Tobacco Company 'celebrities' from 1894. The celebrities set  included famous Australians. An original copy of a card from this set featured Essendon player Bill Crebbin which sold for $10,110 in 2018.

1900–1920 
Other companies that issued earlier football cards were W.D. & H.O. Wills in 1905, and Sniders & Abrahams (featuring scenes of matches in 1908 and then releasing other sets with portraits of football players in the 1910s, all in full color).

W.D. & H.O. Wills also released illustrated sets displaying clubs flags and colors (1908 and 1913) through the Capstan brand.

1920–1930 
In the 1920s one of the most distinctive sets was the 1922 McIntyre Bros cards that featured a tartan design.

1930–1950 
In the 1930s, the Australian division of British Godfrey Phillips Co. released a set of football cards. By the same time, Hoadleys, a local confectionery company, released a set of illustrated cards. Another confectionery company, Clarke-Ellis, also released its own set of cards.

Other companies that launched cards sets in the 1930s were Pals Periodical, Plaistowe & Co., Carreras (two illustrated sets in 1933, the first of them with footballers caricatures by Bob Miram), Giant Licorice Cigarettes, MacRobertson's and W.D. & H.O. Wills, among others.

1950–1990 
During this period it was common for Australian rules football cards to be sold with confectionary, specifically bubble gum. The most popular set of Australian rules football cards are often the considered to be the 1963 Scanlens card set. The most valuable card from the 1963 Scanlens set is that of Graham "Polly" Farmer due to its rarity caused by a printing defect seeing many of that card discarded at production. A 1963 Scanlens Graham "Polly" Farmer card has been recorded selling for $7,200 on eBay.

It is not uncommon for single Scanlens cards can sell for more than $1,000.

A South Australian set produced by AMSCOL featured die-cut cards of SANFL players under the lids of the companies large ice cream tins. Due to poor promotion many people never knew that the cards were included and most were thrown away with the packaging.

1990–present 
Beginning in the 1990s packets of Australian rules football cards started to include special inserts such as signature cards. In 1991 the Stimorol  set was last issue of Australian rules football cards to come with chewing gum.

In 1994 Select issued a set called Cazaly Classics, after Roy Cazaly, that focused on spectacular marks.

To coincide with the 100th season of the VFL/AFL competition Select created a Hall of Fame set which is credited with a causing a boom in the collecting of Australian rules football cards.

In 2019 a premium set of Select cards featured an insert card featuring signatures from David Parkin, Leigh Matthews, Kevin Sheedy, Ron Barassi, all four-time VFL/AFL premiership coaches. This card has been valued at $10,000.

During 2020 "box breaks" or "group breaks" exploded in popularity for Australian rules football cards often involving people online buying a 1/18th share of a box usually aligned to an AFL club.

As a result of better awareness of the hobby due to social media there has been an increase in popularity of Australian rules football cards.

Buying cards online has negatively impacted physical card stores.

Producers

Licensed Producers of Cards 
 Select Australia: The present oldest producer of Australian rules football (AFL) collector cards.
 AFL Team Coach: AFL Team Coach cards are part of an annual set with numbers allocated to each card for games. They are not a collector card. These cards are often targeted specifically to kids.

Former 
 American Tobacco Company
 Godfrey Phillips
 Goodwin & Company
 Sniders & Abrahams
 W.D. & H.O. Wills

Record public sales

Gallery

References

External links

 Select Australia website
 AFL cards on Team Coach website

Trading cards
Australian rules football culture
Sports memorabilia